Bairiga or Ruoni (6,882 m) is the highest peak of Kangri Garpo Range of southeast Tibet Autonomous Region. The region has only recently been explored and before 2009, none of its 47 peaks above 6,000 m had been climbed. Bairiga / Ruoni, which remains unclimbed itself, was photographed for the first time in 1933 by the botanist explorer Frank Kingdon-Ward, at which time it was known as Choembo. 

In 2009, a Sino-Japanese joint climbing team formed by China University of Geosciences (Wuhan) and Kobe University organized an expedition to climb Kangri Garpo II or Ruoni II (6,805 m). On November 5, Deqing Ouzhu and Ciren Danda, Tibetan students with the CUG, were the first to reach the summit, while Koichiro Kondo and Masanori Yazaki scaled the peak two days later. In consultation with a local village leader Kangri Garpo II was renamed Lopchin (Lopchin Feng in Tibetan, Lou bu qin in Chinese), meaning "white male hawk".

See also
 List of Ultras of Tibet, East Asia and neighbouring areas

References

External links
https://web.archive.org/web/20110615025954/http://www.kobe-u.ac.jp/info/topics/pdf/t2009_10_07_01.pdf 神戸大学・中国地質大学（武漢） 崗日嗄布（ｶﾝﾘｶﾞﾙﾎﾟ）山群合同学術登山隊計画  
kangri_garpo_photos 
https://web.archive.org/web/20110720032653/http://www.hb.xinhuanet.com/newscenter/2009-11/11/content_18199470.htm  

Mountains of Tibet
Six-thousanders of the Himalayas